The Kansas Building Science Institute is a vocational school located in Manhattan, Kansas. The Institute conducts week-long Home Energy Rater Trainings (HERS) as well as Building Performance Index (BPI) and Weatherization (WX) Trainings, among others.

Training center
The Institute conducts trainings in a  multi-purpose classroom and training center in Manhattan. The campus also includes a furnace lab, a mobile home for Weatherization Trainings, and an attached house to perform test ratings and inspections on. Other houses around Manhattan are also used for this purpose.

References

External links
Kansas Building Science Institute

Vocational education in the United States
Education in Riley County, Kansas
Education in Kansas
Building engineering organizations
1996 establishments in Kansas
Manhattan, Kansas